Live Kosevo is a performance captured on DVD at the Kosevo Stadium in Sarajevo by Dino Merlin. The concert had many guest performances and part of it was even held in the rain.

Track listing

Burek (feat. Arijander)
Želja
Esma
Kokuzna vremena
Svila
Ti si mene (feat. Nina Badrić)
Ćuskije
Lažu me
Verletzt (feat. Edo Zanki)
Majka ruži kćer (feat. AKUD Seljo)
Mišići
Zid (feat. Kempa Orchestra)
Subota (feat. Gani Tamir)
Sarajevo (feat. Char)
Kremen
Godinama (feat. Ivana Banfić)
Kad čovjek voli ženu (feat. Nermin Puškar & Mahir Beat House)
Supermen (feat. Željko Joksimović)
Sve je laž (feat. Almir Hukelić)
Bosnom behar probeharao
Na Vi

Bonus features

Concert Rehearsals
Jedna si jedina (by TVBiH Symphony Orchestra)

Concert films
2005 video albums
Dino Merlin albums